August Eighth (translit. Avgust. Vosʹmogo) is a 2012 Russian action war film about the 2008 August War. It was produced and directed by Dzhanik Fayziev.

Background
The film tells the story of a young single mother who must make her way to South Ossetia in order to reunite with her son whom she had sent away before the war. The story of the war is shown through two different point of view. One is the mother's and the other is the son's, who sees it in terms of a science fiction story about fighting robots.

In comparison to Olympus Inferno and 5 Days of War, August Eighth was not marketed as a "search for the truth" film. However, it was recognized as a socially important project, and was filmed at the expense of the Russian State Fund for Social and Economic Support of National Cinematography.

Twentieth Century Fox C.I.S., a Russian distributor of 20th Century Fox distributed the film. The Russian premiere took place on 21 February 2012. It premiered on television on 4 November 2012 on Channel One.

Plot 
Kseniya is a 23-year-old pastry chef from Moscow. She is focused on her new romantic relationship. Her seven-year-old son Artyom Fadeev uses his imagination to escape the pain he feels over his parents' separation. In his fantasy, he sees himself as a superhero called "Kosmoboy". Kosmoboy together with a robot called "Edger Beroev", he imagines engaging in battles against the monster robot "Mrakovlast" (“Darklord”).

On August 5, 2008, Kseniya receives a telephone call from Artyom's father Zaur, an Ossetian who serves as a peacekeeper in South Ossetia. Zaur asks Kseniya to send Artyom to live with Zaur's parents in Sidamonta, a village on the border between South Ossetia and Georgia. Zaur assures Kseniya that Artyom would be safe.

After some hesitation, Kseniya agrees because she wants to take a vacation in Sochi with her new boyfriend Yegor, who is a banker. Yegor doesn't get along with Artyom and also wants time alone with Kseniya. Kseniya tells Zaur she will only agree if he sends Artyom back when she asks.

On 7 August 2008, Kseniya learns from news sources that South Ossetia has become a conflict zone. She calls Zaur and demands that Artyom be brought back to Russia. Zaur tries to convince Kseniya that Artyom is safe and happy because his parents enjoy Artyom's presence. Kseniya doesn't agree. She approaches Yegor at his bank, but he doesn't want to become involved in her family situation. The conversation becomes heated and turns to Kseniya's and Yegor's intimate relationship. The conversation continues loudly as Kseniya departs in the lift and it leaves Yegor publicly humiliated.

Kseniya immediately flies to Vladikavkaz, then takes a bus through the Roki tunnel into South Ossetia. An anti-tank missile is fired at her bus. A Russian Army reconnaissance unit helps Kseniya and the other surviving passengers. The unit's commander, Lyoha, takes Kseniya to Tskhinvali, the capital of South Ossetia. That night, the Battle of Tskhinvali begins and the central square is bombarded by Georgian BM-21 Grad rockets.

Kseniya reaches the Dzau refugee camp. Along the way she calls Zaur, who is driving to Sidamonta to evacuate his parents and Artyom. Kseniya and Zaur arrange to meet in Dzau. When Zaur evacuates his parents, he and they are killed by shelling from a Georgian tank. Artyom is injured and runs from the scene in deep shock. Kseniya calls Artyom on his mobile phone, but he can only say Mrakovlast was here... Mrakovlast killed all.... Kseniya decides to rescue Artyom herself. Meanwhile, Artyom is hallucinating due to his injury and sinks deeper into his fantasies.

Kseniya joins Zaur's friend Khasan Baroyev, known as "Ilya" on a Russian military and journalist convoy. Ilya is killed by a Georgian soldier when the convoy is ambushed. Kseniya is saved by Lyoha who is with a reconnaissance unit. Lyoha takes Kseniya to his base which is near where Artyom is hiding.

En route to the base Lyoha's vehicle is attacked by a Georgian tank which he evades. At the base, Lyoha must help many refugees sheltering there and so Kseniya goes on alone. Kseniya finds Artyom who is unable to walk. When Kseniya steals a Georgian army Jeep, she and Artyom are fired upon. All seems lost but then the Georgian army is attacked with a Sukhoi Su-25 air strike giving Kseniya and Artyom the opportunity to escape.
 
Kseniya and Artyom are stopped by a Georgian soldier, Aleksandr Khoshabaev. He takes pity on them and drives them towards the Russian military position. Kseniya walks over a hilltop to approaching Russian tanks. The leading tank stops right in front of her and the commander asks her if she speaks Russian. He asks her to get out of his way. Kseniya and Artyom do so and continue walking. Artyom recovers in hospital and learns the fate of his father. He and Kseniya meet with Lyoha, who tells them that the Russian forces have captured the city of Gori, resulting in Russia winning the war. Kseniya and Artyom are then returned to Russia by helicopter.

Cast

Production 
The central plot is based on two true stories: a man dragged his ex-girlfriend from South Ossetia in August 2008; and the second on the producer's friend's son who suffered dissociation. The film was shot from March to August 2011. Most of the scenes of South Ossetia were shot in Abkhazia and North Ossetia–Alania. Most extras were Abkhazians, but the characters, who speak in Ossetian, were played or were dubbed by North Ossetian actors. The official trailer was created in Trailerhouse by Sundown Entertainment.

Film distribution 
The premiere of the film took place in Moscow on 17 February 2012 at the cinema Pushkinski. The film was released across Russia on 21 February 2012. The premiere was planned for Defender of the Fatherland Day and so the film had much competition. In the first week of distribution the film was in the lead at the box office and collected more than 140,000,000 rubles (about 5,000,000 dollars) for the first weekend. In total, August Eighth netted about 10,000,000 dollars in Russian theaters, much less than the gross of Faiziyev's previous film, Turkish Gambit. The début of the film with English subtitles took place in Australia on 1 September 2012 under the title August 8th at the Russian Resurrection Film Festival 2012.

Home media 
In Russia, the film was released on DVD on 22 March 2012 and on Blu-ray on 14 June 2012. Neither edition contains any subtitles. A French dub of the movie called War Zone was released on DVD and Blu-ray in France on 7 August 2013.

See also 
Olympus Inferno
5 Days of War

References

External links
 

2010s action war films
2012 war drama films
2012 action thriller films
2010s science fiction war films
2012 films
2010s Russian-language films
Russian action war films
Russian war drama films
Russian action thriller films
Russian science fiction war films
Films set in 2008
Films set in Georgia (country)
Films set in Russia
Russo-Georgian War films
20th Century Fox films
Films produced by Fyodor Bondarchuk